Feildes Weir is a weir on the River Lea located in Hoddesdon, Hertfordshire at the confluence of the River Lea and River Stort. The weir marks the start of the Lower Lee. A channel of the man-made River Lee Flood Relief Channel is incorporated into the weir.

History 
The weir has had a complex history of changes to channel control and bypassing over the years. Control was originally exercised by a barrage of gates and sluices.

Flows average about 4.4 m3/s discharge over the weir; higher flows enter the flood channel.

Angling
Angling in the weir pool is controlled by the Ware Angling Club and the River Lea Angling Club.

Access

Road
 From Hoddesdon via A10 road, A1170 road to Dinant Link Road to Rattys Lane.
 From Nazeing via Dobbs Weir Road.

Rail
 Rye House railway station.

Other
 Pedestrian and cycling access via Lea Valley Walk.

External links
 Angling information
 Environment Agency-Feildes Weir

References

Weirs on the River Lea
River Stort